The Scottish Parliament (Constituencies) Act 2004 (c 13) is an Act of the Parliament of the United Kingdom that amends the Scotland Act 1998 which established the Scottish Parliament.

Before it was amended by this Act, the Scotland Act 1998 provided for the constituencies of the Scottish Parliament (known also as Holyrood constituencies) to be the same as those for the United Kingdom Parliament (Westminster), except that Orkney and Shetland were separate constituencies. There are currently 73 constituency Members of the Scottish Parliament (MSPs) and 56 regional additional-member MSPs. (See Scottish Parliament constituencies and regions.) The Scotland Act also provided that the Boundary Commission for Scotland when reviewing the Westminster constituencies should use the same (larger) electoral quota as used in England. This has reduced the number of Scottish Westminster constituencies from 72 to 59. That in turn would have resulted in a reduction in the number of Holyrood constituencies and, because of the requirement in the Scotland Act for proportionality between constituency and regional additional-member seats, a pro rata reduction in the number of regional additional members.

As a consequence of this linkage in the Scotland Act there would therefore have been an automatic reduction in the size of the Scottish Parliament when the number of MPs at Westminster representing Scottish constituencies reduced at the 2005 general election.

In December 2001 the then Secretary of State for Scotland launched a public consultation seeking views on the case for retaining or ending the linking of Westminster and Holyrood constituency boundaries as is provided for by the Scotland Act, in the light of the experience gained from the operation of the Scottish Parliament. The majority of respondents supported retaining the present size of the Parliament, as is now provided for by this Act.

Footnotes 

2004 in Scotland
Acts of the Parliament of the United Kingdom concerning Scotland
United Kingdom Acts of Parliament 2004